This 1980 AFC Asian Cup qualification phase started in December 1978 while other qualification matches took place in early 1979.  A total of 18 teams participated.  Eight teams from the top two of each group advance to the final tournament, joining hosts Kuwait and defending champions Iran.

Groups

 * Withdrew
  qualified as defending champions 
  qualified as hosts

Qualification

Group 1 

All matches played in the United Arab Emirates.

Group 2 

All matches played in Bangladesh.

Group 3 
All matches played in Thailand.

Allocation matches to determine groups
 received a bye

Group 3A

Group 3B

Semi-finals

Third place play-off

Final

 and  qualified for the final tournament Group 4 

All matches played in the Philippines.

 Qualified teams 

 Controversies 
In the 17 November match between Syria and Bahrain, the referee awarded a penalty to Bahrain. The Syrian head coach entered the pitch, threatening the referee, who stopped the match in the 81st minute. The committee initially awarded the match 3–0 in favour of Bahrain, but Syria threatened to withdraw; the committee adjusted its decision to a replay of the match on 25 November, but then Bahrain withdrew. All matches involving Bahrain were annulled.

 References 

Morrison, Neil; Jovanovic, Bojan; Panahi, Majeed; Veroeveren, Pieter. "Asian Nations Cup 1980". RSSSF.
"A-Cup: Singapore in Group Three"
The Straits Times, 19 September 1978, Page 24
"Champions Iran out of Asian Cup final round"
The Straits Times, 25 May 1979, Page 35Al Anwar'', November 1979

AFC
AFC
Qual
Qual
AFC Asian Cup qualification
1980 AFC Asian Cup